Boris Epshteyn (born August 14, 1982) is a Russian-American Republican political strategist, investment banker, and attorney. He was a strategic advisor on the Donald Trump 2020 presidential campaign and has remained a close advisor to Trump in his post-presidency. He was the chief political commentator at Sinclair Broadcast Group until December 2019. He was a senior advisor to Donald Trump's 2016 campaign for President of the United States, and previously worked on the John McCain 2008 presidential campaign. Following Trump's election, he was named director of communications for the Presidential Inaugural Committee, and then assistant communications director for surrogate operations in the White House Office, until he resigned in March 2017. He was a member of a team of Trump lawyers who sought to prevent the certification of Joe Biden's victory in the 2020 presidential election.

Epshteyn and Steve Bannon co-created a cryptocurrency, $FJB, which officially stands for "Freedom Jobs Business" but is also an acronym for "Fuck Joe Biden". As of 2023, the currency has lost 95% of its value.

Early life and education
Epshteyn was born in 1982 in Moscow, Soviet Union, the son of Anna Shulkina and Aleksandr Epshteyn. His family are Russian Jews. In 1993, he immigrated as a refugee with his family to Plainsboro Township, New Jersey under the Lautenberg amendment of 1990. He graduated from West Windsor-Plainsboro High School in 2000.

Epshteyn is a graduate of Georgetown University School of Foreign Service (BSFS, 2004). During his time as an undergraduate at Georgetown, Epshteyn joined the Eta Sigma chapter of the Alpha Epsilon Pi (AEPi) fraternity. He graduated from the Georgetown University Law Center with a J.D. degree in 2007.

Career
Following his graduation from law school, Epshteyn was part of the finance practice of Milbank, Tweed, Hadley & McCloy. He worked on securities transactions, private placements, and bank finance.

In 2008, Epshteyn was a communications aide with the McCain-Palin campaign. While at the campaign, he was part of a rapid response task force that concentrated on issues related to vice presidential nominee Sarah Palin.

Epshteyn was managing director of business and legal affairs at the boutique investment bank West America Securities Corporation until the firm was expelled by the Financial Industry Regulatory Authority in 2013. He is managing director of business and legal affairs for investment banking firm TGP Securities. In October 2013, Epshteyn moderated a panel at the investment conference "Invest in Moscow!". The panel was composed mainly of Moscow city government officials, including Sergey Cheremin, a city minister who heads Moscow's foreign economic and international relations department.

2016 Trump campaign
During the 2016 U.S. presidential campaign, Epshteyn acted as a senior advisor to the Donald Trump campaign, making frequent television appearances as a Trump media surrogate on Trump's behalf.

In September 2016, Epshteyn responded to a question from MSNBC's Hallie Jackson by offering a new explanation for why a portrait of Trumppaid for by the Donald J. Trump Foundationwound up on display at Trump National Doral Miami, a Trump-owned for-profit golf resort in Florida. Epshteyn said, "There are IRS rules which specifically state that when a foundation has an item, an individual can store those itemson behalf of the foundationin order to help it with storage costs... And that's absolutely proper." Epshteyn's explanation was, in effect, that Trump hadn't used his foundation to buy some art for his resort, which would be self-dealing. Instead, Trump's resort was helping the foundationwhich has no employees or office space of its ownto store one of its possessions. Epshteyn's explanation failed to account for why the storage services required that portrait be displayed in public, as opposed to being maintained in a storage space. Similarly, Epshteyn failed to explain why the Trump National Doral Miami provided such storage services only for the Trump Foundation and only for a portrait of Trump.

In September 2016, the media watchdog organization Media Matters for America criticized CNN, Fox News, and PBS for failing to disclose Epshteyn's "financial ties to the former Soviet Union, which include consulting through Strategy International LLC for 'entities doing business in Eastern Europe' and moderating a Russian-sponsored conference on 'investment opportunities in Moscow.'"

In an October 2016 article in The New York Times, three political commentators said in separate interviews that Epshteyn "often acted in a rude, condescending manner toward show staffers, makeup artists and others." Joy Reid, an MSNBC show host, said "Boris is abrasive. That is who he is both on the air and off."

Epshteyn co-hosted the Trump Campaign Facebook Live coverage before and after the final presidential debate. He also anchored Trump Tower Live, the Trump Campaign Facebook live nightly program.

During the 2020 U.S. presidential campaign, Epshteyn acted as a senior advisor to the Trump campaign.

On November 25, 2020 it was reported that he had tested positive for coronavirus.

Trump administration
Epshteyn became a special assistant in the Trump administration as it took office. He wrote Trump's controversial statement for Holocaust Remembrance Day in January 2017, which omitted any mention of the Jewish people. Following criticism of the omission, press secretary Sean Spicer defended the statement as written by "an individual who is both Jewish and the descendent of Holocaust survivors." At the end of March 2017, it was reported that unnamed sources had said Epshteyn was resigning.

Sinclair Broadcast Group
In mid-April 2017, Sinclair announced it had hired Epshteyn as its senior political analyst. Regarding the appointment, Scott Livingston at Sinclair said in part, "We understand the frustration with government and traditional institutions." Epshteyn said in part, "I greatly admire Sinclair's mission to provide thoughtful impactful reporting throughout the country." At the time, Variety also noted Jared Kushner's December 2016 revelation of discussions between the Trump campaign and the company and content provided to the company which, the report said, Sinclair had "vehemently denied".

Trump advisor

Epshteyn was the Strategic Advisor and Co-Chair of the Jewish Voices for Trump Advisory Board for Trump’s 2020 re-election campaign. He led the campaign’s Jewish outreach, appearing in media interviews across national outlets and participating in large-scale events across the country, including in Florida, Pennsylvania, and New York.

Trump garnered the highest Jewish support for a Republican presidential candidate since George H. W. Bush in 1988, receiving 30% of the vote nationally and 42% in the key battleground state of Florida, which Trump won. Trump’s 2020 results with Jewish voters were higher than his 2016 totals, when he received 24% of the Jewish vote nationally and 30% in Florida.

After Trump lost the election, Epshteyn was a member of a team that gathered at a "command center" in the Willard Hotel one block from the White House days before Joe Biden's victory was to be certified by Vice President Mike Pence in the Senate chamber on January 6. The team's objective was to prevent Biden's victory from being certified. On January 2, Trump and two of his attorneys, Rudy Giuliani and John Eastman, held a conference call with some 300 Republican state legislators in battleground states Biden won to provide them with false allegations of widespread voting fraud they might use to convene special sessions of their legislatures to rescind Biden's winning slates of electors and replace them with slates of Trump electors for Pence to certify. On January 5, dozens of Republican legislators from Arizona, Georgia, Michigan, Pennsylvania and Wisconsin wrote Pence asking him to delay the January 6 certification for ten days so they would have time to replace the elector slates. Pence did not act on the request and that day also rejected a proposal made by Eastman that a vice president could simply choose to reject the electoral college results; a vice president's role in certifying the results is constitutionally ministerial. Epshteyn told The Washington Post in October 2021 that he continued to believe Pence "had the constitutional power to send the issue back to the states for 10 days to investigate the widespread fraud and report back well in advance of Inauguration Day, January 20th."

Epshteyn worked with Giuliani in December 2020 to persuade Republican officials in seven states to prepare certificates of ascertainment for slates of "alternate electors" loyal to Trump, which would be presented to Pence for certification. Epshteyn and others asserted this was a contingency similar to the 1960 presidential election, in which two slates of electors were prepared pending results of a late recount of ballots in Hawaii. Both parties agreed to that recount, which ultimately resulted in John F. Kennedy winning the state, though the outcome of the election did not hinge on the Hawaii results. By contrast, in the case of the 2020 election, the stated need for slates of alternate electors in multiple states was predicated on persistent unproven claims of nationwide election fraud. Epshteyn asserted the slates of alternate electors were not fraudulent and "it is not against the law, it is according to the law."

After Trump left office, Epshteyn established a close relationship with the former president and has advised him to pursue a confrontational rather than a conciliatory approach toward those investigating Trump. He was subpoenaed in January 2022 to testify before the House Select Committee on the January 6 Attack.

Personal life
Epshteyn married Lauren Tanick Epshteyn, a sales manager at Google, in 2009. They have one child.

Epshteyn is a friend of Eric Trump, who also attended Georgetown.

Epshteyn is on probation following a bar fight in Scottsdale, Arizona. He pleaded guilty to disorderly conduct and fighting. He was also remanded to alcohol treatment. This was the second such incident. In 2014, Epshteyn was charged with misdemeanor assault. The charge was dropped after he agreed to undergo anger management counseling and perform community service.

References

External links

 

1982 births
American people of Russian-Jewish descent
Donald Trump 2016 presidential campaign
Walsh School of Foreign Service alumni
Georgetown University Law Center alumni
John McCain 2008 presidential campaign
Living people
New Jersey Republicans
New York (state) Republicans
People associated with the 2008 United States presidential election
People associated with the 2016 United States presidential election
People associated with the 2020 United States presidential election
People from Plainsboro Township, New Jersey
Russian emigrants to the United States
Trump administration personnel
West Windsor-Plainsboro High School South alumni
People associated with Milbank, Tweed, Hadley & McCloy